Livingston County is the name of several counties in the United States:

 Livingston County, Illinois
 Livingston County, Kentucky
 Livingston County, Michigan
 Livingston County, Missouri
 Livingston County, New York
 Livingston Parish, Louisiana